Niri Qaghan (Sogdian: nry x’γ’n, Ruanruan: nı̣rı̣ kagan) was a ruler of the Western Turkic Khaganate.

Reign 
According to Baumer he ruled from 579 to circa 602/03. Baumer notes that the better-documented Tardu ruled from 575 to 603. According to de La Vaissere, the unnamed Turkic ruler who was in correspondence with Emperor Maurice was Niri.

Family 
He was the grandson of Muqan Qaghan. His Chinese wife Lady Xiang (向氏) was married to his brother Poshi Tegin (婆實特勤) after his death and submitted to the Tang during end of the Kaiyuan era. However, his exact death date remains problematic. According to Chavannes, he died in 603 in a battle during rebellion. Osawa on the other hand, states he died in 599. He was survived by his son Heshana Khagan.

Legacy 
His memorial complex and statue was found in 2003 by Osawa Takashi in Xinjiang. He founded a Buddhist temple in Romitan.

See also
 Inscription of Hüis Tolgoi

References 

Göktürk khagans
Ashina house of the Turkic Empire
7th-century Turkic people
Founding monarchs
Turkic Buddhist monarchs